Daniel Parkhurst Leadbetter (September 10, 1797 – February 26, 1870) was a two-term U.S. Representative from Ohio in Ohio during the 1840s.

He retired from office before the end of the decade, although he had support to run again.  Later, he served in the American Civil War as a captain.  Settling in Millersburg, the county seat of Holmes County, Ohio, he and his brother, Moses Leadbetter, eventually came to own almost half the town.  Their family remained prominent there for decades.

He was also a relation through marriage of a prominent Millersburg citizen, Robert Justice.

Biography
Leadbetter was born in Pittsfield, Berkshire County, Massachusetts, September 10, 1797. He attended the common schools; moved to Ohio in 1816 and settled in Steubenville, Jefferson County, Ohio where he studied law; was admitted to the bar in 1821 and commenced practice in Steubenville.

Leadbetter was commissioned captain of the Second Company, Third Regiment, Sixth Division, Ohio Militia, in 1821. He moved to Millersburg, Holmes County, in 1828 and continued the practice of law. He was  commissioned quartermaster of the Fourth Division of the Ohio Militia in 1831, and was county recorder 1831-1836.

Congress 
He was elected as a Democrat to the th and th Congresses, (March 4, 1837 – March 3, 1841); was not a candidate for renomination in 1840. He resumed the practice of his profession; also engaged in agricultural pursuits and stock raising. He was a member of the State constitutional convention in 1851 and served as a captain in the United States Civil War in 1862. He died in Millersburg, Ohio, on February 26, 1870; interment in Oak Hill Cemetery.

References

 Margaret B. Walmer, 100 Years at Warrington, York County, Pennsylvania Quakers . 1989. Heritage Books, Inc.
 Birth and Death Records for Holmes County 1869-1877 in Probate Court in Millersburg
 Marguerite Dickinson, Obituaries Abstracted From Holmes County, Ohio Office Papers in Farmer HUB Office Holmes County Historical Society and Western Reserve Historical Society.

1797 births
1870 deaths
Union Army officers
People from Millersburg, Ohio
Politicians from Pittsfield, Massachusetts
Politicians from Steubenville, Ohio
Ohio lawyers
People of Ohio in the American Civil War
Ohio Constitutional Convention (1850)
Democratic Party members of the United States House of Representatives from Ohio
19th-century American politicians
19th-century American lawyers
Military personnel from Massachusetts